Jacques Élisée Reclus (15 March 18304 July 1905) was a French geographer, writer and anarchist. He produced his 19-volume masterwork, La Nouvelle Géographie universelle, la terre et les hommes ("Universal Geography"), over a period of nearly 20 years (1875–1894). In 1892 he was awarded the Gold Medal of the Paris Geographical Society for this work, despite having been banished from France because of his political activism.

Biography
Reclus was born at Sainte-Foy-la-Grande (Gironde). He was the second son of a Protestant pastor and his wife. From the family of fourteen children, several brothers, including fellow geographers Onésime and Élie Reclus, went on to achieve renown either as men of letters, politicians or members of the learned professions.

Reclus began his education in Rhenish Prussia, and continued higher studies at the Protestant college of Montauban. He completed his studies at the University of Berlin, where he followed a long course of geography under Carl Ritter.

Withdrawing from France due to the political events of December 1851, as a young man he spent the next six years (1852–1857) traveling and working in Great Britain, the United States, Central America, and Colombia. Arriving in Louisiana in 1853, Reclus worked for about two and a half years as a tutor to the children of cousin Septime and Félicité Fortier at their plantation Félicité, located about  upriver from New Orleans. He recounted his passage through the Mississippi River Delta and impressions of antebellum New Orleans and the state in Fragment d'un voyage à la Nouvelle-Orléans, published in 1855.

On his return to Paris, Reclus contributed to the Revue des deux mondes, the Tour du monde and other periodicals, a large number of articles embodying the results of his geographical work. Among other works of this period was the short book Histoire d'un ruisseau, in which he traced the development of a great river from source to mouth. During 1867 and 1868, he published La Terre; description des phénomènes de la vie du globe in two volumes.

During the Siege of Paris (1870–1871), Reclus shared in the aerostatic operations conducted by Félix Nadar, and also served in the National Guard. As a member of the Association Nationale des Travailleurs, he published a hostile manifesto against the government of Versailles in support of the Paris Commune of 1871 in the Cri du Peuple.

Continuing to serve in the National Guard, which was then in open revolt, Reclus was taken prisoner on 5 April into Fort Quélern. On 16 November he was sentenced to deportation for life. Because of intervention by supporters from England, the sentence was commuted in January 1872 to perpetual banishment from France.

After a short visit to Italy, Reclus settled at Clarens, Switzerland, where he resumed his literary labours and produced Histoire d'une montagne, a companion to Histoire d'un ruisseau. There he wrote nearly the whole of his work, La Nouvelle Géographie universelle, la terre et les hommes, "an examination of every continent and country in terms of the effects that geographic features like rivers and mountains had on human populations—and vice versa." This compilation was profusely illustrated with maps, plans, and engravings. It was awarded the gold medal of the Paris Geographical Society in 1892. An English edition was published simultaneously, also in 19 volumes, the first four translated by E. G. Ravenstein, the rest by A. H. Keane. Reclus's writings were characterized by extreme accuracy and brilliant exposition, which gave them permanent literary and scientific value.

According to Kirkpatrick Sale:

In 1882, Reclus initiated the Anti-Marriage Movement. In accordance with these beliefs and the practice of union libre ("free unions"), which was common among working-class French in the mid-to-late 1800s, Reclus allowed his two daughters to "marry" their male partners without any civil or religious ceremonies, an action causing embarrassment to many of his well-wishers. Reclus had himself entered a free union in 1872, after the death of his first wife. In 1882 he also wrote Unions Libres, a pamphlet which detailed his anarchist and feminist objections to marriage. The French government initiated prosecution from the High Court of Lyon, arrested him and Peter Kropotkin as the International Association's organizers, and sentenced the latter to five years' imprisonment. Reclus escaped punishment as he remained in Switzerland. In a 1913 piece, Kropotkin, in admiration of Reclus, said that if anyone asked about the conflicts of the Middle East, that "I should merely open the volume of Elisée Reclus's Geographie Universelle L'Asie, Russe..."

Reclus had strong views on naturism and the benefits of nudity. He argued that living naked was more hygienic than wearing clothes; he believed that it was healthier for skin to be fully exposed to light and air so that it could resume its "natural vitality and activity" and become more flexible and firm at the same time. He also argued that from an aesthetic point of view, nudity was better: naked people were more beautiful. His principal objection to clothing was, however, a moral one; he felt that a fixation with clothing caused excessive focus on what was covered.

In 1894, Reclus was appointed chair of comparative geography at the Free University of Brussels, and moved with his family to Belgium. His brother Élie Reclus was at the university already, teaching religion. Élisée Reclus continued to write, contributing several important articles and essays to French, German and English scientific journals. He was awarded the 1894 Patron's Medal of the Royal Geographical Society. 

In 1905, shortly before his death, Reclus completed L'Homme et la terre, in which he rounded out his previous works by considering humanity's development relative to its geographical environment.

Personal life
On 11 March 1858, he was initiated in the regular Scottish Rite Masonic Lodge Les Émules d'Hiram, affiliated to the Grand Orient of France. His brother was just initiated and took part in his masonic baptism. He remained at the initiatel degrees of the Masonic spiritual path.

Reclus married and had a family, including two daughters.

He died at Torhout, near Bruges, Belgium.

Legacy
Reclus was admired by many prominent 19th century thinkers, including Alfred Russel Wallace, George Perkins Marsh, Patrick Geddes, Henry Stephens Salt, and Octave Mirbeau. James Joyce was influenced by Léon Metchnikoff's book La civilisation et les grands fleuves historiques, to which Reclus contributed a foreword.

Reclus advocated nature conservation and opposed meat-eating and cruelty to animals. He was a vegetarian. As a result, his ideas are seen by some historians and writers as anticipating the modern social ecology and animal rights movements.

Selected works

Books
L'Homme et la terre (The Earth and Its Inhabitants"), 6 volumes:
L'Homme et la terre (1905), e-text online, Internet Archive
 
 v.5 Russia in Europe, etc. (Index)
 v.6 Asiatic Russia (Index)

 
 Europe: v.1, v.2, v.3, v.4, v.5
 North America: v.1, v.2, v.3
 Africa: v.1 v.2 v.3 v.4.
 The earth and its inhabitants. The universal geography, ed. by E.G. Ravenstein (A.H. Keane). (J.S. Virtue, 1878)
 The earth and its inhabitants, Asia, Volume 1 (D. Appleton and Company, 1891)
 The Earth and Its Inhabitants ...: Asiatic Russia: Caucasia, Aralo-Caspian basin, Siberia (D. Appleton and Company, 1891)
 The Earth and Its Inhabitants ...: South-western Asia (D. Appleton and Company, 1891)

Anthology
 Du sentiment de la nature dans les sociétés modernes et autres textes, Éditions Premières Pierres, 2002 – 

Articles
 The Progress of Mankind (Contemporary Review, 1896)
 Attila de Gerando (Revue Géographie, 1898)
 A Great Globe (Geograph. Journal, 1898)
 L'Extrême-Orient (Bulletin de la Société royale de géographie d'Anvers, 1898), a study of the political geography of the Far East and its possible changes
  a report made for Parisian newspapers about the Paraguayan War, sympathetic towards the Paraguayan side.
 La Perse (Bulletin de la Société neuchâteloise, 1899)
 La Phénicie et les Phéniciens (ibid., 1900)
 La Chine et la diplomatie européenne (L'Humanité nouvelle series, 1900)
 L'Enseignement de la géographie (Institut de géographie de Bruxelles, No 5, 1901)
 On Vegetarianism (Humane Review, 1901)

 See also 
 Anarchism in France
 Green anarchism

References

Further reading

 
  

 
 
 
 
 
 
 
 
 
 
 
 
 
 
 
 Kropotkin P. A. Obituary. Elisée Reclus // Geographical Journal. 1905. Vol. 26, No. 3, Sept. P. 337-343; Obituary. Elisée Reclus. London, 1905. 8 p.
 
 
 Philippe Pelletier, Elisée Reclus, géographie et anarchie, Paris, Editions du monde Libertaire, 2009.
 
 
 

External links

Élisée Reclus, Research on Anarchism

 

Samuel Stephenson, "Jacques Elisée Reclus (15 March 1830 – 4 July 1905)", Reed College
Ingeborg Landuyt and Geert Lernout, "Joyce's Sources: Les Grands Fleuves Historiques", originally published in Joyce Studies,'' Annual 6 (1995): 99-138.
 Élisée Reclus, "An Anarchist on Anarchy" (1884)
 
 
 

1830 births
1905 deaths
19th-century geographers
19th-century Protestants
Anarcho-communists
Christian anarchists
Christian communists
Communards
Free love advocates
French anarchists
French animal rights activists
French anti-capitalists
French communists
French geographers
French male writers
French naturists
French non-fiction writers
French Protestants
French socialists
French vegetarianism activists
Green anarchists
Human geographers
Male non-fiction writers
Members of the Société Ramond
People from Gironde
Elisee